Ipoly may refer to:

 The river Ipoly (Slovak: Ipeľ), a tributary of the Danube which runs through Slovakia and Hungary
 International Polytechnic High School